The 2000 WPSL Drafts were held on December 4, 1999 at the Tradewinds Resort in St. Petersburg, Florida during the National Fastpitch Coaches Association (NFCA) Convention for the 2000 season.  Draft Day 2000 actually featured three drafts:

 The 2000 Elite/Supplemental Draft selected players from a pool of players on the rosters of the Durham Dragons and Carolina Diamonds, 1999 USA Softball Olympic Trial and Olympic Festival invitees who had completed their collegiate eligibility, and WPSL players who were not on their teams' protected list.  The players from the Diamonds and the Dragons were available to draft because the teams were contracted and their players unassigned.
 The 2000 Senior Draft selected from collegiate senior fastpitch players.  
 The 2001 National Team Draft drew from the 2000 USA Olympic roster, with the hope the players selected would play in the WPSL in 2001. (However, the WPSL suspended play before the 2001 season.) 

Position key: 
C = Catcher; UT = Utility infielder; INF = Infielder; 1B = First base; 2B =Second base SS = Shortstop; 3B = Third base; OF = Outfielder; RF = Right field; CF = Center field; LF = Left field;  P = Pitcher; RHP = right-handed Pitcher; LHP = left-handed Pitcher; DP =Designated player
Positions are listed as combined for those who can play multiple positions.

2000 Women's Pro Softball League Elite/Supplemental Draft
Prior to the Elite/Supplemental Draft, each of the existing WPSL teams presented a listed of 'protected players' from their rosters.  Rostered players who were not on the protected list could be drafted by any of the three other teams.   Each team was allowed to protect six to eight of the players on their rosters.  Protecting more than six players forced teams to surrender picks in rounds seven and eight of the elite/supplemental draft.

In addition to the unprotected players, the pool of players eligible to be drafted in the Elite/Supplemental draft included players on the rosters of the former Durham Dragons and the former Carolina Diamonds, and 1999 USA Softball Olympic Trial and Olympic Festival invitees who had completed their collegiate eligibility.

Following are the Protected Player Lists:
 

 

 

 

Following are the selections from the Elite/Supplemental Draft:

Round 1

Round 2

Round 3

Round 4

Round 5

Round 6

Round 7

Round 8

2000 Women's Pro Softball League Senior Draft
Following are the selections from the Senior Draft:

Round 1

Round 2

Round 3

Round 4

Round 5

Round 6

2001 Women's Pro Softball League National Team Draft
Following are the selections from the National Team Draft:

Round 1

Round 2

Round 3

Round 4

Draft Notes

References

External links 
 

 2000 in softball